The beauty of Binh Duong, or A story of Tam Nuong is a 1957 Vietnamese film directed by Nguyễn Thành Châu and starring Thẩm Thúy Hằng.

Cast
 Thẩm Thúy Hằng as Tam Nương
 Nguyễn Đình Dần as Prince Kinh Luân
 Ba Vân as the silk seller
 Bảy Nhiêu as Mr.Đạt
 Thúy Lan as rural girl
 Kim Vui as Lan Hương
 Minh Tâm as Cúc Hương
 Xích Tùng as Trương Thiên

References 

1957 films
Vietnamese-language films
Vietnamese historical films
1950s historical films